Elections in the Republic of India in 1982 included elections to five state legislative assemblies and to seats in the Rajya Sabha.

Legislative Assembly elections

Haryana

Himachal Pradesh

Kerala

Nagaland

West Bengal

Rajya Sabha

References

External links

 

1982 elections in India
India
1982 in India
Elections in India by year